The 1921–22 Scottish Cup was the 44th staging of Scotland's most prestigious football knockout competition. The Cup was won by Morton who defeated Rangers in the final.

Fourth round

Semi-finals

Final

References

See also
1921–22 in Scottish football

Scottish Cup seasons
1921 in association football
1922 in association football
1921–22 domestic association football cups
Cup